Mukeshbhai Zinabhai Patel (born 19 March 1970) is an Indian politician, Member of legislative assembly from Olpad constituency and took oath as  state minister for agriculture, energy and Petrochemicals in Gujarat government on 16 September 2021. Mr. Patel belong to the Koli caste of Gujarat.

He is the first minister in the state cabinet from Olpad assembly seat in Surat.

References 

1970 births
Living people
Koli people
Bharatiya Janata Party politicians from Gujarat